Thomas R. Dewey (born August 3, 1978) is an American actor, producer, and writer. He co-starred with Michaela Watkins in the Hulu original series Casual.

Early life
Dewey was born in Birmingham, Alabama. He went to Mountain Brook High School, and graduated from the Woodrow Wilson School of Public and International Affairs at Princeton University.

Career
Dewey's first television role was in the Amanda Bynes sitcom What I Like About You. One of his breakout roles was playing opposite Mindy Kaling in the first season of the show The Mindy Project, where he played Josh Daniels, a lawyer who was one of the title character's love interests. As of 2015, Dewey co-stars in the Hulu original series Casual.

Filmography

Film

Television

Producer

Writer

References

External links
 
 
 

1978 births
21st-century American male actors
American male film actors
American male television actors
American male voice actors
American television producers
American television writers
Living people
Male actors from Birmingham, Alabama
American male television writers
Screenwriters from Alabama